Babcock Mission Critical Services Onshore, formerly Bond Air Services (Bond Aviation Group), is an operator of air ambulance, police, and offshore windfarm helicopters in the UK. Babcock operates a mixed fleet of light twin-engine helicopters custom designed to perform specific and specialised tasks. It operates from 17 bases around the UK. It has base maintenance facilities in Staverton and Glasgow.

Babcock Mission Critical Services Onshore has headquarters at Gloucestershire Airport, Staverton, Gloucestershire, which is also home to their training facilities.

Services

Air Operations 
The primary business of Babcock is the provision of an Air Operators Certificate service to end users, including turn-key packages delivering aircraft, pilots, engineers and service support in support of emergency services. This is delivered with their fleet of Airbus (formerly Eurocopter) aircraft.

Design and Completions 
Babcock works in partnership with customers and aircraft manufacturers, providing bespoke design and completion services under Part21G/J approvals. This creates bespoke aircraft and accessories designed for specialised and mission-critical roles – from transporting infants to operating on live high-voltage wires.

Air Training Organisation 

Their training facility includes an EC135 training simulator (Level III FTD) at Staverton, providing in-house training and external training.

History 
In 2013 Babcock provided the first UK night helicopter emergency medical services (HEMS) utilising Night Vision Imaging Systems with East Anglian Air Ambulance.

In 2014, they were contracted by the National Police Air Service (NPAS) to upgrade seven EC135 T2 helicopters with new camera and mission systems technologies.

In 2015, Babcock took delivery of a Eurocopter EC145, ordered the previous year for use with the East Anglian Air Ambulance. They have since taken delivery of another two H145's for the Scottish Ambulance Service. Others have since entered service with East Anglian Air Ambulance and Midlands Air Ambulance. In 2018, they began operating the Airbus Helicopters H135 T3+.

In 2018, they were contracted by Western Power Distribution to upgrade five EC135 helicopters with new mission systems, infrared camera equipment, laser scanning devices and a reconfigured crew workspace.

In 2021, Babcock became the first UK HEMS provider to offer a 24/7 helicopter service to East Anglian Air Ambulance, and later in the same year offering it to Wales Air Ambulance's Cardiff based helicopter.

Customers
Babcock operates a number of helicopters, including air ambulances around the UK and two police support helicopters for Police Scotland, also offering helicopter support for the renewables industry.

Current Helicopter Operations 

Babcock currently provides turn-key helicopter operations for these customers:
 East Anglian Air Ambulance (2011–Present)
 North West Air Ambulance  (1999–Present)
 Midlands Air Ambulance (1990–Present) 
 Great Western Air Ambulance (2008–Present)
 Police Scotland (2013–Present)
 Scottish Charity Air Ambulance (2010–Present)
 Hampshire & Isle of Wight Air Ambulance (2007–Present)_
 Wales Air Ambulance (2001-2024)

Former Helicopter Operations 
 Scottish Ambulance Service (1990's-2020)
 Air Ambulance Northern Ireland (2015-2022)
 Thames Valley Air Ambulance (2011-2022)
 Ørsted Walney Wind Farm Extension (2018-2021)
 PSE Kinsale Oil Platform Support (2015-2020)
 SSE Greater Gabbard Wind Farm Support (2013-?)

Prince William

In 2014, it was announced that Prince William, Duke of Cambridge would take on a full-time role as a pilot with Bond Air Services  based at Cambridge Airport. Although a qualified military pilot able to operate as a Sea King captain, William needed a civilian commercial pilot's licence and further training before starting operations for the East Anglian Air Ambulance. The Duke started operational flights on 13 July 2015 and continued until 2017. His salary was donated to charity.

Incidents

 On 29 November 2013, G-SPAO, an EC135-T2+ operated by Bond Air Services on behalf of Police Scotland, crashed through the roof of the Clutha Vaults pub in Glasgow, killing all three people on board and seven in the building, and injuring 31 people.
 On 4 May 2020, G-SASS, an EC145-D2 operated by Babcock on behalf of Scottish Ambulance Service partially lifted the roof of a nearby caravan with its downwash on departure from the Isle of Arran.

See also
Babcock Mission Critical Services Offshore
Babcock Scandinavian Air Ambulance
Babcock Mission Critical Services Australasia
Babcock International
Bond Aviation Group

References

External links
 Babcock International Emergency Services

Helicopter airlines
Airlines of the United Kingdom
Air ambulance services in the United Kingdom
Police aviation units of the United Kingdom